Mountain of God is a song recorded by Christian rock band Third Day. It was released as a single from the band's 2005 album Wherever You Are.

Charts
Weekly

Decade-end

References

2006 singles
Third Day songs
Songs written by Mac Powell
2005 songs
Essential Records (Christian) singles
Song recordings produced by Brown Bannister